Go Player (literally "Go Youngsters" or "Go Boy") is a children's animated series. It was produced in China.The first season is set in the late Ming Dynasty and follows the development of Jiang Liu'er, a young man with a talent for the game of Go.

The show spans two seasons with 26 episodes in each. The story focuses on the journey of a young, gifted Go player, Liuer Jiang. The first season first aired on CCTV in 2006. The second season, called Go Player 2 (围棋少年2), aired in 2009.

See also
 Hikaru no Go, a Japanese series about Go

References

External links 
 CCTV program site (in Simplified Chinese)

2006 Chinese television series debuts
2009 Chinese television series endings
Chinese children's animated television series
Works about Go
China Central Television original programming
Television series set in the Ming dynasty